Sophie Lacher (born 25 September 1995) is a German professional racing cyclist. She rides for the Feminine Cycling Team.

See also
 List of 2015 UCI Women's Teams and riders

References

External links
 

1995 births
Living people
German female cyclists
Sportspeople from Kassel
Cyclists from Hesse